Veronza Leon Curtis Bowers Jr. is an inmate at the United States Penitentiary in Atlanta, Georgia. He is a former member of the Black Panther Party, and was sentenced to life imprisonment on the charge of first degree murder of U.S. park ranger Kenneth Patrick at Point Reyes National Seashore in 1973.

Bowers was eligible for mandatory parole after 30 years. In February 2005, 10 months after he served 30 years in prison, his parole was postponed to give the victim's relatives a chance to express their opposition at a new parole hearing. Bowers was denied parole in October 2005 and December 2011. Bowers has maintained his innocence during his entire 46 years of imprisonment, and through all parole hearings. The evidence that convicted him was based solely off of the testimony of two government informants, both of whom received a reduction in their sentences, and one of whom received $10,000.

References

External links
Veronza Bowers, Jr.

Living people
Year of birth missing (living people)
Members of the Black Panther Party

American prisoners sentenced to life imprisonment
American people convicted of murdering police officers
People convicted of murder by the United States federal government
Prisoners sentenced to life imprisonment by the United States federal government